The Tri-Valley Ranchers was a 2007 expansion team from the National Indoor Football League (NIFL). They played their home games at the Amador Pavilion in Pleasanton, California.  Originally, there were supposed to be two different NIFL expansion teams with the Alameda Action and the Anaheim Street Boys, but they came together to form one team, the Alameda Street Boys.  Later on, they changed their name again to represent the Tri-Valley region.

Season-by-season 

|-
|2007 || 1 || 1 || 0 || 4th Pacific || --

External links
Tri-Valley Ranchers Official website

National Indoor Football League teams
Sports in Alameda County, California
American football teams in the San Francisco Bay Area
2006 establishments in California
2007 disestablishments in California
American football teams established in 2006
American football teams disestablished in 2007
Defunct American football teams in California